Róża is the Polish variant of the name Rose. It may refer to:

People
Róża Berger (1889–1945), only verified victim of the 1945 Kraków pogrom
Róża Herman (1902–1995), Polish chess player
Róża Kasprzak (b. 1982), Polish pole vaulter
Róza Laborfalvi (1817–1886), Hungarian actress
Róża Etkin-Moszkowska (1908–1945), Polish pianist
Róża Maria Wodzicka (1868–1902), Polish noblewoman
Róża Potocka (disambiguation), several people
Róża Thun (b. born 1954), European Parliament Member from Poland

Places
Róża, Łódź Voivodeship (central Poland)
Róża, Lublin Voivodeship (east Poland)
Róża, Podkarpackie Voivodeship (south-east Poland)
Róża, Nowy Tomyśl County in Greater Poland Voivodeship (west-central Poland)
Róża, Słupca County in Greater Poland Voivodeship (west-central Poland)
Róża, Warmian-Masurian Voivodeship (north Poland)

Film
Róża (1936 film), a 1936 Polish film
Róża (2011 film), a 2011 Polish film

See also
Roza (disambiguation)
Rózsa